Jason Holman (born April 28, 1983) is an American football offensive / defensive lineman for the Qingdao Clipper of the China Arena Football League (CAFL). He played as a center for the University of Maryland before transferring to Winston-Salem State University where he played as a defensive lineman. He was signed as an undrafted free agent by the Grand Rapids Rampage in 2008.

Holman was selected by the Qingdao Clipper of the CAFL in the second round of the 2016 CAFL Draft. He rushed for 77 yards and 1 touchdown during the 2016 season. He is listed on the Clipper's roster for the 2018 season.

References

External links
 Jacksonville Sharks bio

1983 births
Living people
American football centers
American football defensive linemen
Maryland Terrapins football players
Winston-Salem State Rams football players
Winston-Salem State University alumni
Grand Rapids Rampage players
Colorado Crush players
Billings Outlaws players
Hamilton Tiger-Cats players
Jacksonville Sharks players
Richmond Revolution players
Richmond Raiders players
Philadelphia Soul players
People from Midlothian, Virginia
Players of American football from Virginia
Qingdao Clipper players